Massepha is a genus of moths of the family Crambidae.

Species
Massepha absolutalis Walker, 1859
Massepha ambialis Hampson, 1903
Massepha asiusalis (Walker, 1859)
Massepha bengalensis Moore
Massepha entephriadia Hampson, 1898
Massepha flavimaculata Gaede, 1917
Massepha gracilis Hampson, 1899
Massepha grammalis (Guenée, 1854)
Massepha grisealis Hampson, 1917
Massepha longipennis Hampson, 1912
Massepha lupa (Druce, 1899)
Massepha ohbai Yoshiyasu, 1990
Massepha rectangulalis Caradja in Caradja & Meyrick, 1933
Massepha rufescens Hampson, 1912
Massepha syngamiodes Hampson, 1912
Massepha tessmanni Gaede, 1917

Former species
Massepha carbonalis Warren
Massepha fulvalis Hampson, 1898

References

George Mathew, 2006. AN INVENTORY OF INDIAN PYRALIDS (LEPIDOPTERA: PYRALIDAE). Zoos' Print Journal 21(5): 2245-2258
afromoths.net
Natural History Museum Lepidoptera genus database

Pyraustinae
Crambidae genera
Taxa named by Francis Walker (entomologist)